The 1984 Colorado Buffaloes football team represented the University of Colorado in the Big Eight Conference during the 1984 NCAA Division I-A football season. Led by third-year head coach Bill McCartney, the Buffaloes finished at 1–10 (1–6 in Big 8, seventh), their sixth consecutive losing season. Home games were played on campus at sixty-year-old Folsom Field in Boulder, Colorado.

The season was marked by the trauma late in the second game at Oregon on September 15, as sophomore tight end Ed Reinhardt of Littleton suffered a career-ending, life-threatening brain injury. Airlifted to Denver a month later, he was in a coma for 62 days and was partially paralyzed.

Colorado's sole win came in mid-season, by two points over last-place Iowa State on homecoming. The Buffs' previous one-win season was four years earlier; the next was in 2012.

The following spring, McCartney switched to a wishbone offense for 1985.

Schedule

Roster

References

External links
University of Colorado Athletics – 1984 football roster
Sports-Reference – 1984 Colorado Buffaloes

Colorado
Colorado Buffaloes football seasons
Colorado Buffaloes football